The following is a list of notable deaths in October 2019.

Entries for each day are listed alphabetically by surname. A typical entry lists information in the following sequence:
 Name, age, country of citizenship at birth, subsequent country of citizenship (if applicable), reason for notability, cause of death (if known), and reference.

October 2019

1
Gilbert Albert, 89, Swiss jeweller.
Joseph Bismuth, 92, Tunisian politician, senator (2005–2011).
Cain Hope Felder, 76, American theologian and author.
Anders Ferm, 81, Swedish diplomat, Ambassador to the United Nations (1982–1988).
Karel Gott, 80, Czech singer, acute myeloid leukemia.
Han Qiwei, 85, Chinese hydraulic engineer, member of the Chinese Academy of Engineering.
Jouko Innanen, 66, Finnish cartoonist.
Gertrude Newsome Jackson, 95, American community activist.
Miguel León-Portilla, 93, Mexican anthropologist and historian.
Michel Létourneau, 69, Canadian politician, MNA (1994–2007).
C. K. Menon, 70, Indian transportation executive and philanthropist, complications from pneumonia.
Fred Molyneux, 75, English footballer (Southport, Plymouth Argyle, Tranmere Rovers).
Esther Takei Nishio, 93, American internee (Granada War Relocation Center).
Wolfgang Perner, 52, Austrian biathlete, Olympic bronze medalist (2002).
Eric Pleskow, 95, Austrian-born American film producer, President of United Artists (1973–1978) and Orion Pictures (1978–1991).
Richard Scotton, 88, Australian health economist.
Peter Sissons, 77, British journalist and broadcaster (BBC News, ITN, Question Time).
Dick Soash, 78, American politician, member of the Colorado Senate (1976–1984).
Arto Tchakmaktchian, 86, Egyptian-born Armenian-Canadian sculptor and painter.
Gérald Tougas, 86, Canadian writer.
Ruben A. Valdez, 82, American politician, member (1970–1978) and Speaker (1975–1976) of the Colorado House of Representatives.
Beverly Watkins, 80, American blues guitarist.
Wen Chuanyuan, 101, Chinese aeronautical engineer, designed China's first UAV and first flight simulator.

2
Grazia Barcellona, 90, Italian Olympic skater (1948).
Michael Bauman, 69, American theologian.
Bill Bidwill, 88, American football team owner (Arizona Cardinals).
Cecil Butler, 82, American baseball player (Milwaukee Braves). 
Custom Made, 34, American eventing horse, Olympic gold medallist (2000).
Julie Gibson, 106, American actress (Nice Girl?, The Feminine Touch, Lucky Cowboy) and singer.
Robert Hickman, 76, Australian football player (Richmond).
Tiny Hill, 92, New Zealand rugby union player (Canterbury, Counties, national team) and selector.
Giya Kancheli, 84, Georgian composer (Unusual Exhibition, Don't Grieve, Mimino).
Jafar Kashani, 74, Iranian footballer (Shahin, Persepolis, national team), heart attack.
John Kirby, 79, American attorney, namesake of Kirby, myelodysplastic syndrome.
Paul LeBlanc, 73, Canadian makeup artist (Amadeus, No Country for Old Men, Big Fish), Oscar winner (1985).
Beth Palmer, 67, American bridge player, breast cancer.
Isaac Promise, 31, Nigerian footballer (Gençlerbirliği, Antalyaspor, national team), Olympic silver medallist (2008), heart failure.
Hanno Selg, 87, Estonian modern pentathlete, Olympic silver medallist (1960).
Kim Shattuck, 56, American singer, songwriter and musician (The Muffs, The Pandoras, Pixies), amyotrophic lateral sclerosis.
Hargovind Laxmishanker Trivedi, 87, Indian nephrologist.
Matthew Wong, 35, Canadian painter, suicide.
Alan Zaslove, 91, American animation director and producer (Darkwing Duck, Aladdin, Chip 'n Dale: Rescue Rangers).
Ezra Zilkha, 94, American financier and philanthropist.

3
Márta Balogh, 76, Hungarian handball player (Budapesti Spartacus SC, national team), world champion (1965).
Vinnie Bell, 87, American inventor and guitarist.
John Buchanan, 88, Canadian politician, MLA (1967–1990) and Premier of Nova Scotia (1978–1990).
Lewis Dauber, 70, American actor (The Fall Guy), liver cancer.
Dana Fradon, 97, American cartoonist (The New Yorker), liver cancer.
Diogo Freitas do Amaral, 78, Portuguese politician, Acting Prime Minister (1980–1981), Minister of National Defence (1981–1983) and Foreign Affairs (1980–1981 and 2005–2006).
Philip Gips, 88, American graphic designer and film poster artist (Alien, Rosemary's Baby, Downhill Racer).
Coluthur Gopalan, 100, Indian nutritionist.
Hu Yamei, 96, Chinese physician and leukemia researcher, President of Beijing Children's Hospital (1982–1989).
Percy Lewis, 90, Trinidadian-born British Olympic boxer (1952).
Stephen J. Lukasik, 88, American physicist, respiratory failure.
Philip K. Lundeberg, 96, American naval historian and World War II veteran, last survivor of the USS Frederick C. Davis sinking.
Hussein Adel Madani, Iraqi cartoonist and political activist, shot.
Teresa Maryańska, 82, Polish paleontologist.
Ignacio Noguer Carmona, 88, Spanish Roman Catholic prelate, Bishop of Guadix (1976–1990) and Huelva (1993–2006).
Roger Taillibert, 93, French architect (Parc des Princes, Olympic Stadium Montreal), complications from a fall.
Wei Zhongquan, 81, Chinese satellite engineer, chief designer of the Fengyun-2 and Yaogan-1 satellites.

4
Ed Ackerson, 54, American singer-songwriter, musician (Polara, Antenna) and record producer, pancreatic cancer.
Peter Beckwith, 80, American Anglican prelate, Bishop of Springfield (1992–2010).
Glen Brown, 75, Jamaican reggae musician and record producer.
Mikhail Biryukov, 27, Russian tennis player, suicide 
Diahann Carroll, 84, American actress (Julia, Dynasty, Claudine), Tony winner (1962), cancer.
Bryce Gaudry, 76, Australian politician, MLA (1991–2007), pancreatic cancer.
Margaret Lyons, 95, Canadian radio executive, assisted suicide.
Satya Priya Mahathero, 89, Bangladeshi Buddhist monk and social worker.
Bill McKnight, 79, Canadian politician, MP (1979–1993).
Stephen Moore, 81, British actor (A Bridge Too Far, The Last Place on Earth, The Hitchhiker's Guide to the Galaxy).
Fred Ohene-Kena, 83, Ghanaian politician.
Elmer Rees, 77, Welsh mathematician.
Enno Röder, 83, German Olympic skier (1960, 1964).
James Schmerer, 81, American TV writer and producer (MacGyver, CHiPs, The High Chaparral), complications of a stroke.
Alberto Testa, 96, Italian dancer and choreographer.
Bob Tufts, 63, American baseball player (Kansas City Royals, San Francisco Giants), multiple myeloma.
Zhang Guobao, 74, Chinese politician, Director of the National Energy Administration (2007–2011).
Zhang Siying, 94, Chinese engineer, member of the Chinese Academy of Sciences.

5
Lee Botts, 91, American environmentalist.
Dave Cummings, 79, American actor.
Dolores Dorn, 85, American actress (The Bounty Hunter, Underworld U.S.A.).
Andy Etchebarren, 76, American baseball player (Baltimore Orioles, California Angels, Milwaukee Brewers).
Amalia Fuentes, 79, Filipino actress (Rodora, My Only Love, Kahit Isang Saglit), cardiac arrest.
Marcello Giordani, 56, Italian operatic tenor, heart attack.
Gary Goldschneider, 80, American astrologer and pianist.
David Greaves, 73, English snooker player.
Tony Hoar, 87, British racing cyclist, cancer.
Kang Laiyi, 83, Chinese epidemiologist.
Henry Keizer, 58, Dutch politician, Chairman of the People's Party for Freedom and Democracy (2014–2017).
Blaine Lindgren, 80, American sprinter, Olympic silver medalist (1964).
Roger Mayorga, 73, Nicaraguan footballer (Motagua, national team), heart attack.
Eloy Pérez, 32, American boxer.
Philip J. Prygoski, 71, American legal scholar.
Vijay Sardeshmukh, 67, Indian classical vocalist, cancer.
Sally Soames, 82, English photographer.
Philippe Vandevelde, 62, Belgian comics writer (Le Petit Spirou, Soda, Spirou et Fantasio), heart attack.

6
Abdulaziz bin Abdullah Al Zamil, 77, Saudi Arabian oil executive, Chairman of Saudi International Petrochemical Company (since 2004).
Ginger Baker, 80, English Hall of Fame drummer (Cream, Blind Faith, Ginger Baker's Air Force), subject of Beware of Mr. Baker.
Paul Bircher, 90, British rower, Olympic silver medallist (1948).
Yevgeny Bushmin, 61, Russian politician.
Ciaran Carson, 70, Northern Irish poet, lung cancer.
Vlasta Chramostová, 92, Czech actress (The Trap, The Cassandra Cat, The Cremator).
Seán Clohessy, 87, Irish hurler (Tullaroan, Kilkenny).
Ezequiel Esperón, 23, Argentine footballer (Grêmio, Atlante), fall.
Joseph Gourmelon, 81, French politician, Deputy (1981–1993).
Stuart Heydinger, 92, British photojournalist.
Larry Junstrom, 70, American bassist (Lynyrd Skynyrd, 38 Special).
Masaichi Kaneda, 86, Japanese Hall of Fame baseball player (Kokutetsu Swallows, Yomiuri Giants) and manager (Lotte Orions), sepsis.
Khenpo Karthar Rinpoche, 95, Tibetan Karma Kagyu lama, abbot of Karma Triyana Dharmachakra (since 1976).
Martin Lauer, 82, German athlete, Olympic champion (1960).
Neale Lavis, 89, Australian equestrian, Olympic champion (1960).
Eddie Lumsden, 83, Australian rugby league player (St. George Dragons, Manly Sea Eagles, national team).
John Mbiti, 87, Kenyan-born Swiss scholar.
Samvel Mnatsyan, 29, Russian ice hockey player (Barys Astana, HC Neftekhimik Nizhnekamsk, Admiral Vladivostok), cancer.
Bernard Muna, 79, Cameroonian politician, Deputy Prosecutor of the International Criminal Tribunal for Rwanda (1997–2001), heart disease.
Karen Pendleton, 73, American actress (The Mickey Mouse Club), heart attack.
David Petel, 98, Iraqi-born Israeli politician, member of the Knesset (1959–1969).
Paul Gerhardt Rosenblatt, 91, American judge.
S. A. Stepanek, 59, American poet.
Stephen Swid, 78, American performance rights executive (SESAC), complications from frontotemporal degeneration.
Rip Taylor, 88, American actor (The $1.98 Beauty Show, Chatterbox, Down to Earth) and comedian.

7
Ovide Alakannuark, 80, Canadian politician, MLA (1999–2004).
Harvey Benge, 75, New Zealand photographer.
Herman Berendsen, 85, Dutch chemist.
Beppe Bigazzi, 86, Italian journalist and restaurateur.
Chen Zhongyi, 96, Chinese civil engineering professor and politician, Vice Chairman of the Taiwan Democratic Self-Government League.
Warren William Eginton, 95, American judge (District Court for the District of Connecticut, 1979–1992).
Barry Jackson, 82, English rugby union player (Broughton Park, Lancashire, national team).
Ed Kalafat, 87, American basketball player (Minneapolis Lakers).
Krishnamoorthy, 55, Indian Tamil actor, heart attack.
Janusz Kondratiuk, 76, Kazakh-born Polish film director.
Jari Laukkanen, 57, Finnish Olympic cross-country skier (1988).
Tony Mulhearn, 80, British political campaigner, lung disease.
Ulick O'Connor, 90, Irish writer.
Stephen Okumu, 61, Kenyan Olympic boxer (1984).
Pepe Oneto, 77, Spanish journalist (Cambio 16) and writer.
Eugène Saccomano, 83, French journalist.
Wilson Sutherland, 84, British mathematician.
Ella Vogelaar, 69, Dutch politician and trade union leader, Minister for Housing, Communities and Integration (2007–2008), suicide.
Makoto Wada, 83, Japanese illustrator, essayist and film director (Mahjong hōrōki, Kaitō Ruby), pneumonia.

8
Eduard Admetlla i Lázaro, 95, Spanish scuba diver, designer and photographer.
Serafim Fernandes de Araújo, 95, Brazilian Roman Catholic cardinal, Archbishop of Belo Horizonte (1986–2004), complications from pneumonia.
John Bennett, 77, Australian politician, Attorney-General of Tasmania (1986–1989).
Litia Cakobau, 78, Fijian politician and tribal chief.
Carlos Celdran, 46, Filipino cultural activist and performance artist, cardiac arrest.
Ed Cray, 86, American journalist and biographer. 
Francis S. Currey, 94, American technical sergeant, Medal of Honor recipient.
Molly Duncan, 74, Scottish saxophonist (Average White Band), cancer.
Georgette Elgey, 90, French journalist and historian.
Eberhard Ferstl, 86, German Olympic bronze medallist field hockey player (1956).
Ted Green, 79, Canadian ice hockey player (Boston Bruins, Winnipeg Jets) and coach (Edmonton Oilers).
Chip Healy, 72, American football player (St. Louis Cardinals).
Roland Janson, 80, Swedish actor (Sällskapsresan, Rederiet).
Ryan Nicholson, 47, Canadian film director (Gutterballs) and visual effects artist (The Predator, Blade: Trinity), brain cancer.
Helen Shingler, 100, British actress (Quiet Weekend, The Lady with a Lamp, Room in the House).
Harcharan Singh, 81, Indian cricketer (Services, Southern Punjab).
Helen Stother, 64, English cricketer (England).
Sammy Taylor, 86, American baseball player (Chicago Cubs, New York Mets).
Michael Uhlmann, 79, American political scientist.
Louis Waller, 84, Australian legal scholar.
Split Waterman, 96, English speedway rider.
Reg Watson, 93, Australian television producer (Prisoner, Neighbours, Sons and Daughters) and screenwriter.
Quade Winter, 68, American composer and opera singer.
Saadi Younis, 69, Iraqi footballer (national team), heart attack.
Talaat Zakaria, 59, Egyptian actor and comedian (Call Mama, Sayed the Romantic), inflammation of the brain.

9
Richard Askey, 86, American mathematician, discoverer of Askey–Wilson polynomials, Askey scheme and Askey–Gasper inequality.
Dorothea Buck, 102, German author.
Éamonn Burns, 56, Northern Irish Gaelic footballer (Down).
John W. Corso, 89, American production designer (Coal Miner's Daughter, The Breakfast Club, Ferris Bueller's Day Off).
Robert W. Estill, 92, American Episcopal prelate, Bishop of North Carolina (1983–1994).
Reino Fagerlund, 65, Finnish Olympic judoka (1980).
Thomas Flanagan, 88, Irish-born American Roman Catholic prelate, Auxiliary Bishop of San Antonio (1998–2005).
Jill Freedman, 79, American photographer, cancer.
Lorand Gaspar, 94, Hungarian-born French poet.
Andrés Gimeno, 82, Spanish tennis player, French Open winner (1972).
Robert Guestier Goelet, 96, French-born American banker (Chemical Bank) and philanthropist.
Anne Hart, 84, Canadian author.
Samuel Hynes, 95, American author, heart failure.
James O. Mason, 89, American physician, public health administrator and Acting Surgeon General of the United States (1989–1990).
Ion Moraru, 90, Moldovan writer and political activist (Sabia Dreptății).
Filippo Penati, 66, Italian politician, President of the Province of Milano (2004–2009), Mayor of Sesto San Giovanni (1994–2001).
Murray Rosenblatt, 93, American statistician and academic.
John Baptist Sequeira, 89, Indian Roman Catholic prelate, Bishop of Chikmagalur (1987–2006).
Satnarine Sharma, 76, Trinidadian judge, Chief Justice (2002–2008).
Erling Steineide, 81, Norwegian Olympic cross country skier (1964).
Jan Szyszko, 75, Polish politician, academic and forester, Minister of Environment (1997–1999; 2005–2007; 2015–2018).
David Weisman, 77, American film producer (Kiss of the Spider Woman) and author.
John Williams, 79, Australian football player (Carlton).
Yang Enze, 99, Chinese telecommunications engineer and academic, cerebral hemorrhage.
Louis-Christophe Zaleski-Zamenhof, 94, Polish-born French civil engineer and Esperantist.

10
Moji Akinfenwa, 89, Nigerian politician, senator (1999–2003).
Pierre Albrecht, 88, Swiss Olympic basketball player (1952).
Sir Desmond Cassidi, 94, British admiral, Commander-in-Chief, Naval Home Command (1983–1984).
Ugo Colombo, 79, Italian racing cyclist.
Marie Darby, 79, New Zealand marine biologist.
Md. Golam Mostofa, 70, Bangladeshi freedom fighter.
William J. Hamilton, 86, American politician, member of the New Jersey General Assembly (1972–1978) and Senate (1978–1982).
Dominic Jala, 68, Indian Roman Catholic prelate, Archbishop of Shillong (since 1999), traffic collision.
Richard Jeranian, 98, Armenian-born French painter and draftsman.
Tarek Kamel, 57, Egyptian politician and computer engineer, cancer.
Juliette Kaplan, 80, British actress (Last of the Summer Wine, Coronation Street), cancer.
John Kirkham, 84, British Anglican prelate, Bishop of Sherborne (1976–2001) and Bishop to the Forces (1992–2001).
Enrique Moreno, 63, Mexican-born American lawyer, complications from cancer.
Trinidad Morgades Besari, 88, Equatorial Guinean writer.
Marie-José Nat, 79, French actress (A Woman in White, Violins at the Ball, La Vérité), cancer.
Paul Polak, 86, American psychiatrist and entrepreneur, heart failure.
Gordon Robertson, 93, Canadian ice hockey player, Olympic champion (1952).
Miklós Szabó, 81, Hungarian sports shooter (1960).
Stuart Taylor, 72, English footballer (Bristol Rovers).
Joseph E. Tregoning, 78, American politician, member of the Wisconsin State Assembly (1967–1990).
Tsai Ying-wen, 67, Taiwanese political scientist, gastroesophageal reflux disease.

11
Sam Bobrick, 87, American television writer (Saved by the Bell, Gomer Pyle, U.S.M.C., The Smothers Brothers Comedy Hour), stroke.
Mac Christensen, 85, American clothier, president of the Mormon Tabernacle Choir (2000–2012).
Woodie Flowers, 76, American mechanical engineering professor (Massachusetts Institute of Technology).
Robert Forster, 78, American actor (Jackie Brown, The Black Hole, Medium Cool), brain cancer.
John Giorno, 82, American poet and performance artist, subject of Sleep, heart attack.
Kadri Gopalnath, 69, Indian saxophonist, cardiac arrest.
Joseph Helszajn, 85, Belgian-born British electrical engineer.
Aubrey Kuruppu, 74, Sri Lankan cricketer.
Alexei Leonov, 85, Russian cosmonaut (Voskhod 2), first person to walk in space.
Ram Mohan, 88, Indian animator (The Chess Player, Kaamchor, Meena).
Michael Mott, 88, British-born American poet, novelist and biographer.
Ali Nakhjavani, 100, Azerbaijani-born Iranian Baháʼí Faith leader.
Pasupuleti Purnachandra Rao, 71, Indian film historian (Silent Cinema (1895-1930)) and critic.
Oriano Ripoli, 95, Italian politician, Mayor of Pisa (1985–1986).
Heather Robson, 91, New Zealand badminton and tennis player.
Ettore Spalletti, 79, Italian artist, heart attack.
James Hart Stern, 55, American civil rights activist, cancer. 
Richard Tracey, 71, Australian judge and military officer, Judge Advocate General (2007–2014), cancer.
Gillian Trumper, 83, English-born Canadian politician and coroner, complications from renal failure.
Gundeboina Rammurthy Yadav, 71, Indian politician, MLA (1994–1999).

12
Mel Aull, 90, Canadian football player.
Kate Braverman, 70, American author, cardiac arrest.
Joyce Cansfield, 90, British crossword compiler.
E. A. Carmean, 74, American art curator and historian, cancer.
Carlo Croccolo, 92, Italian actor, voice actor, director and screenwriter. (47 morto che parla, After the Fox, Three Men and a Leg)
Sara Danius, 57, Swedish literary critic and philosopher, member (2013–2019) and Permanent Secretary (2015–2018) of the Swedish Academy, breast cancer.
Ding Shisun, 92, Chinese mathematician and politician, President of Peking University (1984–1989), Chairman of the China Democratic League (1996–2005).
Nanni Galli, 79, Italian racing driver.
María Luisa García, 100, Spanish chef and cookbook author, proponent of Asturian cuisine.
Bob Goin, 81, American college sports administrator, athletics director (Florida State University, University of Cincinnati).
Dallas Harms, 84, Canadian country musician.
Jackie Hernández, 79, Cuban baseball player (Kansas City Royals, Pittsburgh Pirates), World Series champion (1971), cancer.
James Hughes-Hallett, 70, British business executive (Swire Group).
Hevrin Khalaf, 34, Syrian politician and activist, Secretary General of the Kurdish Future Movement in Syria, shot.
Milcho Leviev, 81, Bulgarian jazz pianist.
Emilio Nicolas Sr., 88, Mexican-born American television station owner (KWEX).
Alison Prince, 88, British children's writer.
Norman Schofield, 75, Scottish-American political scientist.
Yoshihisa Yoshikawa, 83, Japanese sport shooter, Olympic bronze medallist (1960, 1964), heart failure.

13
John Algeo, 89, American linguist.
William T. Allen, 75, American law academic.
Hideo Azuma, 69, Japanese manga artist, esophageal cancer.
Scotty Bowers, 96, American author (Full Service) and pimp.
Bobby Del Greco, 86, American baseball player (Pittsburgh Pirates, Philadelphia Phillies, Kansas City Athletics).
Duan Qingbo, 55, Chinese archaeologist (Mausoleum of the First Qin Emperor), Dean of the School of Cultural Heritage of Northwest University (since 2017), kidney cancer.
Helen Fix, 97, American politician.
Jay Frank, 47, American music executive, founder of DigSin, cancer.
Richard Huckle, 33, British convicted sex offender, strangled and stabbed.
Charles Jencks, 80, American architect, cultural theorist (Post-modernism) and philanthropist, co-founder of Maggie's Centres.
Mikheil Kobakhidze, 80, Georgian film director, screenwriter and composer.
Sophia Kokosalaki, 47, Greek fashion designer, cancer.
Ulrich Luz, 81, Swiss theologian.
Vasim Mammadaliyev, 77, Azerbaijani theologian.
Elias James Manning, 81, American-born Brazilian Roman Catholic prelate, Bishop of Valença (1990–2014).
Goran Marković, 33, Serbian-born Montenegrin footballer (Željezničar Sarajevo, Čukarički, Zrinjski Mostar), fall.
Adolfo Mexiac, 92, Mexican graphic artist.
Włodzimierz Mucha, 63, Polish architect.
Sucheta Nadkarni, 52, Indian management studies academic.
Kanako Naito, 38, Japanese volleyball player.
Theo Verbey, 60, Dutch composer.

14
Harold Bloom, 89, American literary critic and writer (The Anxiety of Influence, The Western Canon: The Books and School of the Ages).
Bohdan Butenko, 88, Polish cartoonist.
Steve Cash, 73, American singer-songwriter, author and harmonica player (The Ozark Mountain Daredevils).
Emmett Chappelle, 93, American scientist (NASA) and World War II veteran (Buffalo Soldier), kidney failure.
Charles Dausabea, 59, Solomon Islands politician, MP (1990–1993, 1997–2001, 2006–2008).
Buckwheat Donahue, 68, American sportsman and tourism promoter.
Francisco Figueredo, 59, Paraguayan Olympic athlete (1984).
Louis Frey Jr., 85, American politician, member of the U.S. House of Representatives (1969–1979).
Anke Fuchs, 82, German lawyer and politician, Federal Minister of Health (1982) and Vice President of the Bundestag (1998–2002).
Danny Grant, 73, Canadian ice hockey player (Minnesota North Stars, Detroit Red Wings, Los Angeles Kings), Calder Memorial Trophy winner (1968).
Rosemary Harris, 96, British author (The Moon in the Cloud).
Igor Kaleshin, 67, Russian football player (Akhmat Grozny, Druzhba Maykop, Kuban Krasnodar) and manager (Kuban Krasnodar).
Barun Mazumder, 77, Indian journalist and writer.
Lorne Main, 89, Canadian tennis player.
Baby Saroja, 88, Indian actress (Balayogini, Thyaga Bhoomi, Kamadhenu).
Renato Scrollavezza, 92, Italian luthier.
Cooper Snyder, 91, American politician, member of the Ohio Senate (1979–1996).
Jeffrey Spalding, 67, Canadian artist, stroke.
Karola Stotz, 56, German philosopher.
Sulli, 25, South Korean singer (f(x)), songwriter and actress, suicide by hanging.
Michael C. Thomas, 71, American entomologist.
Gunnar Torvund, 71, Norwegian sculptor.
John Wilson Nattubu Tsekooko, 76, Ugandan lawyer and judge.
Patrick Ward, 69, Australian actor (The Unisexers, The Chain Reaction, My Two Wives).
Bob Will, 94, American Olympic rower (1948).
Yvonne S. Wilson, 90, American politician, member of the Missouri House of Representatives (1999–2005) and Senate (2005–2010).

15
Tamara Buciuceanu, 90, Romanian actress (Silent Wedding, Everybody in Our Family), heart disease.
Cacho Castaña, 77, Argentine singer and actor (Los Hijos de López, Merry Christmas), lung disease.
John Cavanagh, 98, British neurobiologist.
Andrew Cowan, 82, Scottish rally driver and team owner (Ralliart).
Hossein Dehlavi, 92, Iranian composer (Mana and Mani).
Robert Louis Dressler, 92, American botanist.
Stefan Edlis, 94, Austrian-born American art collector and philanthropist.
Mary Stuart Gile, 83, American politician, member of the New Hampshire House of Representatives (1996–2019).
Jiang Haokang, 84, Chinese aerospace engineer.
R. Bruce Hoadley, 96, American materials scientist.
Igo Kantor, 89, American film producer (Kingdom of the Spiders, Mutant, Act of Piracy) and post-production executive.
Michael D. Reynolds, 65, American astronomer and educator.
Song Soon-chun, 85, South Korean boxer, Olympic silver medallist (1956).

16
Ed Beck, 83, American basketball player (Kentucky Wildcats).
Utpal Bhayani, 66, Indian playwright and critic.
Paolo Bonaiuti, 79, Italian politician and journalist, MP (1996–2018).
Bin Cheng, 98, Chinese-born British legal scholar, Dean of the UCL Faculty of Laws (1971–1973).
John Clarke, 88, American actor (Days of Our Lives), complications from pneumonia.
Patrick Day, 27, American professional boxer, brain injuries sustained in bout.
Bernard Fisher, 101, American surgeon, pioneer in breast cancer treatment.
Yehezkel Flomin, 84, Israeli politician, member of the Knesset (1974–1981).
Arline Friscia, 84, American politician, member of the New Jersey General Assembly (1996–2004).
Han Aiping, 57, Chinese Hall of Fame badminton player, lung cancer.
Morton Mandel, 98, American industrial parts executive and philanthropist.
Volodymyr Mulyava, 82, Ukrainian politician, MP (1994–1998).
Ángel Pérez García, 62, Spanish football player (Real Madrid, Elche) and manager (Sangonera), cancer.
Harold Scheub, 88, American professor and folklorist of African cultures.
Andrey Smirnov, 62, Russian swimmer, Olympic bronze medalist (1976).
John Tate, 94, American mathematician (Tate's thesis, Tate conjecture, Tate cohomology group), Abel Prize winner (2010).

17
Alicia Alonso, 98, Cuban prima ballerina, founder of the National Ballet.
Michael F. Armstrong, 86, American lawyer.
Hildegard Bachert, 98, German-born American art dealer (Galerie St. Etienne) and gallery director.
Michael Bowen, 89, British Roman Catholic prelate, Archbishop of Southwark (1977–2003).
Zev Braun, 91, American film and television producer (Tour of Duty).
Elijah Cummings, 68, American politician, member of the U.S. House of Representatives (since 1996) and Maryland House of Delegates (1983–1996).
Alan Diamonstein, 88, American politician, member of the Virginia House of Delegates (1968–2002).
Horace Romano Harré, 91, New Zealand-born British philosopher and psychologist.
Procter Ralph Hug Jr., 88, American federal judge.
Bob Kingsley, 80, American Hall of Fame radio host (American Country Countdown, Bob Kingsley's Country Top 40), bladder cancer.
Márta Kurtág, 92, Hungarian pianist.
Bill Macy, 97, American actor (Maude, The Producers, The Jerk).
Göran Malmqvist, 95, Swedish linguist, sinologist and literary historian, member of the Swedish Academy.
Victor Mohica, 86, American actor (Blood In Blood Out).
Edmundo Rada, Venezuelan politician, shot.
Ray Santos, 90, American saxophonist and composer.
Wendy Williams, 84, British actress (Crossroads, Doctor Who).

18
Luiz Olavo Baptista, 81, Brazilian jurist.
Sir John Boyd, 83, British diplomat, Ambassador to Japan (1992–1996).
Edward Clark, 93, American painter.
Nicolás Díaz, 90, Chilean politician and cardiologist, senator (1990–1998) and Mayor of Rancagua (1963–1964, 1967–1968).
Michael Flaksman, 73, American cellist.
Volker Hinz, 72, German photographer.
Mark Hurd, 62, American technology executive, CEO of Hewlett-Packard (2005–2010) and Oracle Corporation (since 2014).
Ahad Israfil, 47, American gunshot survivor.
Rui Jordão, 67, Angolan-born Portuguese footballer (Benfica, Sporting CP, national team), heart disease.
Kalidas Karmakar, 73, Bangladeshi painter and printmaker.
William Milliken, 97, American politician, Governor of Michigan (1969–1983).
Lou Palmer, 84, American sportscaster (SportsCenter, WFAN), lung cancer.
Mike Reilly, 77, American football player (Chicago Bears, Minnesota Vikings).
Mikhail Semyonov, 80, Russian politician.
Meir Shamgar, 94, Israeli lawyer and politician, Chief Justice of the Supreme Court (1983–1995).
Victor Sheymov, 73, Russian cybersecurity innovator and KGB officer.
Kamlesh Tiwari, 45, Indian politician, shot.
Bruce Walton, 68, American football player (Dallas Cowboys).
Zhao Yannian, 90, Chinese politician, Vice Minister of the State Ethnic Affairs Commission (1986–2003).

19
Erhard Eppler, 92, German politician, Minister for Economic Development (1968–1974).
Salvador Giner, 85, Spanish sociologist, President of the Institute of Catalan Studies (2005–2013).
E. Bruce Heilman, 93, American educator and veterans advocate, President of the University of Richmond (1971–1986, 1987–1988).
Youssef Hourany, 88, Lebanese archaeologist and historian.
Jakir Khan, 56, Bangladeshi film director, cancer.
Ishmael Levenston, 79, Saban politician, member of the Island Council (1975–1979, 1983–1987) and founder of the Saba Labour Party.
Joseph Lombardo, 90, American mobster, consigliere of the Chicago Outfit.
Theodor Wonja Michael, 94, German Africanist and journalist.
Mikhail Motsak, 69, Russian naval officer.
Deborah Orr, 57, Scottish journalist (The Guardian, The Independent), breast cancer.
Carlos Suárez, 73, Spanish cinematographer (Unmarried Mothers, Rowing with the Wind), Goya Award winner (1988).
Alexander Volkov, 52, Russian tennis player.

20
Herbert Chappell, 85, British conductor, composer and film-maker.
Eric Cooper, 52, American baseball umpire, blood clot.
Thomas D'Alesandro III, 90, American politician, Mayor of Baltimore (1967–1971), complications from a stroke.
Arnold Gosewich, 85, Canadian literary agent, book publishing consultant and record industry executive.
Sir Peter Graham, 85, British lawyer and parliamentary draftsman, First Parliamentary Counsel (1991–1994).
Joseph Houssa, 89, Belgian politician, senator (1988–1995) and Mayor of Spa (1983–2018).
Huang Yong Ping, 65, Chinese-born French avant-garde installation artist and sculptor.
Rufus E. Jones, 79, American politician, member of the Tennessee House of Representatives (1981–1996).
Asbjørn Liland, 83, Norwegian politician. 
Norman Myers, 85, British environmentalist, dementia.
Aquilino Pimentel Jr., 85, Filipino politician, President of the Senate (2000–2001) and senator (1987–1992, 1998–2010), lymphoma and pneumonia.
Robert I. Price, 98, American vice admiral (US Coast Guard).
Gonzalo de Jesús Rivera Gómez, 85, Colombian Roman Catholic prelate, Auxiliary Bishop of Medellín (1998–2010).
Martin Tenni, 85, Australian politician, member of the Queensland Legislative Assembly (1974–1989).
Nick Tosches, 69, American journalist, music critic and writer (Country, The Devil and Sonny Liston, The Last Opium Den).
Dottie Wham, 94, American politician, member of the Colorado General Assembly (1984–2000).
Mellony Wijesinghe, 17, Sri Lankan netball player, leukemia.

21
Gilberto Aceves Navarro, 88, Mexican sculptor and painter.
Willie Brown, 78, American Hall of Fame football player (Denver Broncos, Oakland Raiders) and coach.
John M. Downs, 82, American courtroom sketch artist, lymphoma.
Josip Elic, 98, American actor (The Twilight Zone, One Flew Over the Cuckoo's Nest, Black Rain), complications from a fall.
Bengt Feldreich, 94, Swedish journalist and television host (From All of Us to All of You), pneumonia.
Jerry Fogel, 83, American actor (The Mothers-in-Law, The White Shadow).
Gerald Freihofner, 73, Austrian journalist.
Mike Hebert, 75, American volleyball coach (Minnesota Golden Gophers).
Gillian Jagger, 88, British sculptor and painter.
Nissim Karelitz, 93, Israeli rabbi, heart disease.
Garry Koehler, 64, Australian country musician and songwriter, cancer.
Taras Kutovy, 43, Ukrainian politician, MP (2012–2014) and Minister of Agrarian Policy and Food (2016–2018), helicopter crash.
Kent Larsson, 67, Swedish Olympic rower (1980).
Lho Shin-yong, 89, South Korean politician, Prime Minister (1985–1987) and Minister of Foreign Affairs (1980–1982).
Ingo Maurer, 87, German industrial designer.
Aila Meriluoto, 95, Finnish poet, writer and translator.
Brian Noble, 83, British Roman Catholic prelate, Bishop of Shrewsbury (1995–2010).
Reginald Tate, 65, American politician, member of the Tennessee Senate (2006–2018).
Florence Signaigo Wagner, 100, American botanist.
Camille Zaidan, 75, Lebanese Maronite hierarch, Archbishop of Antelias (since 2012).

22
Christos Archontidis, 81, Greek football manager (Korinthos, PAOK, national team).
George Brancato, 88, American football player and coach (Ottawa Rough Riders).
Manfred Bruns, 85, German attorney and LGBT rights activist.
Ed Cherney, 69, American recording engineer, record producer and Grammy winner (1994, 2003, 2016, 2018), cancer.
Chris, 9, Australian sheep, world record holder for heaviest fleece.
Vicki Funk, 71, American botanist.
Til Gardeniers-Berendsen, 94, Dutch politician, Minister of Social Work (1977–1981) and of Health (1981–1982), member of the Council of State (1983–1995).
Guo Dehong, 77, Chinese historian.
Ole Henrik Laub, 81, Danish novelist, stomach cancer.
Raymond Leppard, 92, British conductor, director of the Indianapolis Symphony Orchestra (1987–2001).
Mike McClennan, 75, New Zealand rugby league player (Auckland, national team) and coach (St Helens). (body found on this date)
Dorylas Moreau, 72, Canadian Roman Catholic prelate, Bishop of Rouyn-Noranda (2001–2019).
Sadako Ogata, 92, Japanese academic and diplomat, United Nations High Commissioner for Refugees (1990–2000).
Lelio Orci, 82, Italian endocrinologist.
Bachirou Osséni, 33, Beninese footballer (Vitória, Diegem Sport, national team).
Rolando Panerai, 95, Italian baritone singer.
Miguel Saiz, 70, Argentine politician, Governor of Río Negro (2003–2011).
Marieke Vervoort, 40, Belgian wheelchair racer, Paralympic champion (2012), assisted suicide.
Hans Zender, 82, German conductor and composer (Stephen Climax).
Zeng Rongsheng, 95, Chinese geophysicist, member of the Chinese Academy of Sciences.
Therese Zenz, 87, German sprint canoer, Olympic silver medallist (1956, 1960).
Jo Ann Zimmerman, 82, American politician, Lieutenant Governor of Iowa (1987–1991).

23
Duncan Forbes, 78, Scottish footballer (Colchester United, Norwich City), complications from Alzheimer's disease.
Vicki Gregory, 51, British microbiologist, cancer. 
J. Rogers Hollingsworth, 87, American historian and sociologist.
Ji Xiaocheng, 95, Chinese pediatrician, introduced perinatal medicine to China.
Demetrio Jiménez Sánchez-Mariscal, 56, Spanish Roman Catholic prelate, Prelate of Cafayate (since 2014).
Santos Juliá, 79, Spanish historian and sociologist (National University of Distance Education).
James W. Montgomery, 98, American Episcopalian prelate, Bishop of Chicago (1971–1987).
David O. Morgan, 74, British historian.
Bernie Parrish, 83, American football player (Cleveland Browns).
George Proud, 80, Canadian politician, MP (1988–2000).
Kingsley Rock, 81, Montserratian cricketer (national team).
Fides Romanin, 84, Italian Olympic cross country skier (1952, 1956).
Hansheinz Schneeberger, 93, Swiss violinist.
Tom Stevens, 63, American politician, founder of the Objectivist Party.
Francis A. Sullivan, 97, American theologian.
Francis Tresham, 83, British game designer.
Martin Vosseler, 71, Swiss renewable energy advocate, co-founder of Physicians for Social Responsibility, traffic collision.
Xiao Han, 92, Chinese politician and coal executive, Minister of Coal Industry (1977–1980), Chairman of China Huaneng Group and Shenhua Group (1995–1998).
Xie Gaohua, 87, Chinese politician, Party Secretary of Yiwu (1982–1984), founded the Yiwu Market.
Alfred Znamierowski, 79, Polish vexillologist.

24
Michael Blumlein, 71, American writer and physician.
Janusz Brzozowski, 84, Polish-born Canadian computer scientist.
Walter Franco, 74, Brazilian singer and composer, stroke.
Leroy Johnson, 91, American politician, member of the Georgia State Senate (1963–1975).
Patricia de Souza, 55, Peruvian writer.
Norm Stoneburgh, 84, Canadian football player (Toronto Argonauts).
George Tarasovic, 89, American football player (Pittsburgh Steelers, Philadelphia Eagles, Denver Broncos).
Ruth van Heyningen, 101, British biochemist.
Kaoru Yachigusa, 88, Japanese actress (Samurai Trilogy, Hachiko Monogatari, Agatha Christie's Great Detectives Poirot and Marple), pancreatic cancer.

25
Renzo Burini, 92, Italian footballer (Lazio, Milan, national team).
Chou Wen-chung, 96, Chinese-born American composer.
Gerry Dalton, 84, Irish sculptor. (death announced on this date)
Murray Feshbach, 90, American economist. 
Salvador Freixedo, 96, Spanish ufologist and priest.
Peter H. Hassrick, 78, American artist and author, cancer.
Hu Dujing, 106, Chinese plant physiologist, agronomist and educator.
William Loren Katz, 92, American historian and author.
Ghulam Mohammad Lot, 90, Pakistani politician, MPA (1993–1996), cardiac arrest.
Rafael Ninyoles i Monllor, 76, Spanish Catalan sociolinguist.
Dilip Parikh, 82, Indian politician, Chief Minister of Gujarat (1997–1998).
Mário Sabino, 47, Brazilian Olympic judoka (2000, 2004), shot.
Humayun Kabir Sadhu, 37, Bangladeshi television director, screenwriter and actor, stroke.
Vittorio Seghezzi, 95, Italian racing cyclist.
Kafil Uddin Sonar, 75, Bangladeshi politician, MP (1988–1990).
Carlo Strenger, 61, Swiss-Israeli psychologist and philosopher.
Joe Sun, 76, American country singer ("Old Flames Can't Hold a Candle to You").
Don Valentine, 87, American venture capitalist (Sequoia Capital).
Janko Vučinić, 53, Montenegrin boxer and politician, MP (since 2012) and President of the Workers' Party (since 2015).
Rudolf G. Wagner, 77, German sinologist.
Janet Yee, 85, Singaporean social worker.

26
Paul André Albert, 93, American metallurgist.
Paul Barrere, 71, American rock singer and guitarist (Little Feat), liver cancer.
Enriqueta Basilio, 71, Mexican Olympic sprinter and hurdler (1968).
Clinton Bernard, 89, Trinidadian judge, Chief Justice (1985–1995).
Raymond Ward Bissell, 83, American art historian.
Daniel W. Dobberpuhl, 74, American electrical engineer.
Jack Dunnett, 97, British politician and football administrator, MP for Nottingham Central (1964–1974) and Nottingham East (1974–1983).
Robert Evans, 89, American film producer (Chinatown, Marathon Man) and studio executive (Paramount Pictures).
Gao Di, 91, Chinese politician, Communist Party Secretary of Jilin.
Thangeswary Kathiraman, 67, Sri Lankan politician, MP (2004–2010).
Mārtiņš Ķibilds, 45, Latvian journalist and television host (Gribi būt miljonārs?).
Chuck Meriwether, 63, American baseball umpire, cancer.
V. Nanammal, 99, Indian yoga teacher, complications from a fall.
Pan Handian, 98, Chinese legal scholar and translator (Lifetime Achievement Award in Translation).
Gregory E. Pyle, 70, American politician, Chief of the Choctaw Nation of Oklahoma (1997–2014).
Pascale Roberts, 89, French actress (The Women Couldn't Care Less, The Sleeping Car Murders, Plus belle la vie).
Thaddeus Seymour, 91, American academic.
John Stauffer, 94, American politician.
John D. Turner, 81, American historian. 
Hiromi Yoshida, 70, Japanese politician, member of the House of Councillors (since 2001), brain cancer.

27
Abu Bakr al-Baghdadi, 48, Iraqi insurgent and cleric, Emir of the Islamic State of Iraq (2010–2013) and Leader of ISIL (since 2013), suicide by explosive vest.
Abul-Hasan al-Muhajir, Saudi spokesman of ISIL (since 2016), airstrike.
Roger Ballenger, 69, American politician, member of the Oklahoma Senate (2006–2014), melanoma.
Vladimir Bukovsky, 76, Russian-born British human rights activist and political dissident, heart attack.
Tim Chambers, 54, American college baseball coach (UNLV Rebels).
Stephen P. Cohen, 83, American political scientist and security expert.
John Conyers, 90, American politician, Dean (2015–2017) and member of the U.S. House of Representatives (1965–2017).
Kelly C. Crabb, 72, American sports and entertainment lawyer.
John Crncich, 94, Canadian football player.
Cécile Goldet, 105, French physician and politician, senator (1979–1984).
Humayun Kabir, 67, Bangladeshi lawyer and politician, deputy minister, MP (1986–1990), heart attack.
Guido Lauri, 96, Italian dancer and choreographer.
Johanna Lindsey, 67, American novelist (Fires of Winter, Hearts Aflame), complications of treatment for lung cancer.
Ivan Milat, 74, Australian serial killer (backpacker murders), oesophageal and stomach cancer.
Anne Phelan, 71, Australian actress (Bellbird, Prisoner, Winners & Losers).
Sir Malcolm Ross, 76, British royal courtier, Master of the Household of the Prince of Wales (2006–2008).
Vladimir Rubin, 95, Russian composer, People’s Artist (1995).
Kamal Sharma, 49, Indian politician, heart attack.
Mary Spiller, 95, British horticulturist and teacher.
Hans-Peter Uhl, 75, German politician, MP (1998–2017).
Xi Enting, 73, Chinese table tennis player, world champion (1973), thoracic aortic rupture.

28
Safaa Al Sarai, 26, Iraqi human rights activist.
Annick Alane, 94, French actress (Hibernatus, Pour la peau d'un flic, Three Men and a Cradle).
Al Bianchi, 87, American basketball player (Syracuse Nationals/Philadelphia 76ers), coach (Seattle SuperSonics) and general manager (New York Knicks).
Alfred L. Bright, 79, American artist and educator.
Glen Cavaliero, 92, English poet and literary critic.
Jean-Gabriel Diarra, 74, Malian Roman Catholic prelate, Bishop of San (since 1987).
Ron Dunlap, 72, American basketball player (Maccabi Tel Aviv).
Maria Flytzani-Stephanopoulos, 69, Greek-born American chemical engineer, cancer.
Art Foley, 90, Irish hurler (Wexford).
Kay Hagan, 66, American politician, U.S. Senator (2009–2015), complications from Powassan virus.
Piyare Jain, 97, Indian particle physicist.
Zoltán Jeney, 76, Hungarian composer.
Dean L. Larsen, 92, American Mormon historian.
Mao Kao-wen, 83, Taiwanese chemist, politician, and diplomat, Minister of Education (1987–1993).
Ken McCracken, New Zealand rugby league player (Auckland, national team), prostate cancer.
Bert Mozley, 96, English footballer (Derby County, national team).
Toivo Salonen, 86, Finnish speed skater, Olympic bronze medalist (1956).
Keith Schellenberg, 90, British Olympic bobsledder and luger (1956, 1964).
John Walker, 82, American politician, member of the Arkansas House of Representatives (since 2011).

29
Gerald Baliles, 79, American politician, Governor (1986–1990) and Attorney General of Virginia (1982–1985), member of the Virginia House of Delegates (1976–1982), renal cell carcinoma.
David Bostock, 83, British philosopher.
Cong Weixi, 86, Chinese author.
Claude Constantino, 80, Senegalese Olympic basketball player (1968).
Kees Driehuis, 67, Dutch television presenter, cancer.
Pat Griffin, 75, Irish Gaelic footballer (Kerry).
Hiroshi Kashiwagi, 96, American poet, playwright and actor.
Johnny Joyce, 82, Irish football player (Dublin GAA).
Richard Lennon, 72, American Roman Catholic prelate, Bishop of Cleveland (2006–2016).
Mustapha Matura, 79, Trinidadian playwright.
Epineri Naituku, 56, Fijian rugby union player (national team).
Ignazio Paleari, 65, Italian racing cyclist.
Charlie Taaffe, 69, American football coach (Hamilton Tiger-Cats, Montreal Alouettes, Army Black Knights), cancer.
John Witherspoon, 77, American actor (Friday, The Wayans Bros., The Boondocks), heart attack.

30
Russell Brookes, 74, British rally driver, British Rally champion (1977, 1985).
Georges Courtès, 94, French astronomer.
Paul Crosby, 30, American basketball player (Mississippi Valley State, Minas), traffic collision.
Ron Fairly, 81, American baseball player (Los Angeles Dodgers, Montreal Expos) and broadcaster (Seattle Mariners).
Beatrice Faust, 80, Australian author and women's activist.
Paul Geis, 66, American Olympic long-distance runner (1976).
Frank Giles, 100, British journalist and historian, editor of The Sunday Times (1981–1983).
Jim Gregory, 83, Canadian ice hockey coach (Toronto Marlboros) and executive (Toronto Maple Leafs).
William J. Hughes, 87, American politician and diplomat, member of the U.S. House of Representatives (19751995), ambassador to Panama (1995–1998).
Francis Xavier Irwin, 85, American Roman Catholic prelate, Auxiliary Bishop of Boston (1996–2009).
Sam Jankovich, 84, American sports administrator.
Mobolaji Johnson, 83, Nigerian military officer, Governor of Lagos State (1967–1975).
Bernard Slade, 89, Canadian playwright (Same Time, Next Year) and screenwriter (The Flying Nun, The Partridge Family), complications from Lewy body dementia.
Azam Taleghani, 76, Iranian politician and journalist, MP (1980–1984).
J. Bob Traxler, 88, American politician, member of the U.S. House of Representatives (1974–1993) and Michigan House of Representatives (1962–1974).
Ercílio Turco, 81, Brazilian Roman Catholic prelate, Bishop of Limeira (1989–2002) and Osasco (2002–2014), cancer.
N. Venkatachala, 89, Indian judge, member of the Supreme Court (1992–1995).
Paul Whelan, 75, Australian politician, NSW Minister for Police (1995–2001).

31
Ebrahim Abadi, 85, Iranian actor (Mokhtarnameh, On Tiptoes, Grand Cinema).
Anil Adhikari, 70, Indian politician, MLA (since 2011), cancer.
Robert I. Berdon, 89, American justice, Associate Justice of the Connecticut Supreme Court (1991–1999).
Enrico Braggiotti, 96, Monegasque banker, President of the Banca Commerciale Italiana (1988–1990).
Tarania Clarke, 20, Jamaican footballer (Waterhouse, national team), stabbed.
Ann Crumb, 69, American actress (Anna Karenina) and singer, ovarian cancer.
Gurudas Dasgupta, 82, Indian politician, MP (1985–2000, 2004–2014), lung cancer.
Noble Frankland, 97, British historian.
Geetanjali, 72, Indian actress (Seetharama Kalyanam, Murali Krishna, Kalam Marindi), cardiac arrest.
Florence Giorgetti, 75, French actress (La Grande Bouffe, The Lacemaker, Pepe Carvalho).
Champak Jain, 52, Indian film producer (Khiladi, Main Khiladi Tu Anari, Josh).
Tom MacIntyre, 87, Irish writer and poet.
Raju Mavani, 62, Indian film producer, director, actor and screenplay writer, cancer.
Roger Morin, 78, American Roman Catholic prelate, Bishop of Biloxi (2009–2016).
Amjad Nasser, 64, Jordanian writer and poet.
Jack O'Dell, 96, American civil rights activist.
Silvio Padoin, 89, Italian Roman Catholic prelate, Bishop of Pozzuoli (1993–2005).
Ren Xuefeng, 54, Chinese politician, Party Secretary of Guangzhou (2014–2018), Deputy Party Secretary of Chongqing (since 2018), fall.
Giannis Spanos, 85, Greek composer.
Vito Trause, 94, American soldier and prisoner of war.
Antoon van der Steen, 83, Dutch racing cyclist.

References

2019-10
 10